McLaughlin group may refer to:
McLaughlin group (mathematics), a sporadic finite simple group
The McLaughlin Group, a weekly public affairs program broadcast in the United States